Moss & Associates  is one of the southeast USA's largest privately held general contractors providing a variety of services including design/build, general construction, construction management and preconstruction consulting for commercial, institutional and residential projects. In addition to its Fort Lauderdale, headquarters, the company has offices in Miami, Tampa, Clearwater, and Ocala, Florida; Greenville, South Carolina; and El Paso, Texas. Moss & Associates is one of the top  institutional contractors in the nation, the seventh largest general contractor in Florida and the second largest in South Florida.

Moss has projects in the United States and The Bahamas, including: Nova Southeastern University in Davie, Florida; the Biomedical Research Center for the University of Miami's Institute for Human Genomics; and Bass Pro Shops in Clarksville, Indiana. They are part of the joint venture known as Hunt-Moss, which is constructed the Marlins Park in the Little Havana section of the City of Miami.

History
Bob L. Moss, a 40-year veteran of the construction trade spent 22 years with a Fortune 250 construction firm, where he managed the company's Florida operations and eventually became chairman, president and CEO.  He retired from that position and in March 2003 established Moss & Associates in 2004. His son, Scott Moss, was one of the first to join the team and son, Chad Moss, followed soon thereafter. Scott Moss serves as the company's President and Chad Moss is Senior Vice President. As of 2017 the company had approximately 540 employees.

Operations
Moss & Associates is a recipient of the University of South Florida's Sunshine State Safety Award.

As the eighth largest green builder in the southeast, and counted among the top 100 green builders in the United States, Moss & Associates takes a proactive approach to preserving the environment by investing heavily in LEED training for executives and operations and preconstruction teams. By 2009, Moss had 35 employees designated as LEED Accredited Professionals (AP) with an additional 27 in the process of obtaining the AP designation offered by the U.S. Green Building Council. In 2013, Moss & Associates agreed to acquire Peter R. Brown Construction, the construction management at risk business of Atkins.

In 2019, Moss & Associates made an investment in Fortress Identity, a Miami-based company specialising in active and passive biometric identity solutions.

Major Projects
Florida Marlins Ballpark: Miami
City Place South Tower: West Palm Beach, Florida
Downtown Dadeland: Miami, Florida
Emerald Grande at HarborWalk Village: Destin, Florida
Himmarshee Landing: Fort Lauderdale, Florida 
The Ivy: Miami, Florida 
The Mint: Miami, Florida
Bass Pro Shops: Clarksville, Indiana
University of Miami Biomedical Research Center: Miami, Florida 
Nova Southeastern University, University Center: Davie, Florida
Nova Southeastern University Performing Arts Center: Davie, Florida
Nova Southeastern University Dormitory Housing: Davie, Florida
Leon Medical Center – Flagler: Miami, Florida
Bay Correctional Facility Expansion: Panama City, Florida
Gadsden Correctional Facility: Lecanto, Florida
Palm Beach County Jail Expansion: Belle Glade, Florida

References

Construction and civil engineering companies of the United States
Construction and civil engineering companies established in 2004
Companies based in Fort Lauderdale, Florida